The Opera House in Winchester, Kentucky, United States was designed in 1873 by the first Mayor of Winchester, J. D. Simpson. The opera house was a gift from the mayor to Winchester's citizens so they could enjoy performing arts. It hosted off-Broadway and classical concerts.

The building fell to industrialization and became rundown from years of neglect. It was bought by Edward and Vanessa Ziembroski in 2003, who renovated the building.

References
http://www.city-data.com/picfilesv/picv15725.php

External links
Official website

Opera houses in Kentucky
Theatres completed in 1873
Music venues completed in 1873
1873 establishments in Kentucky
Winchester, Kentucky
Buildings and structures in Clark County, Kentucky